Goriz-e Karidi (also Romanized as Gorīz-e Karīdī) is a village in Seyyed Abbas Rural District, Shavur District, Shush County, Khuzestan Province, Iran. At the 2006 census, its population was 293, in 39 families.

References 

Populated places in Shush County